Lars Rüdiger (born 17 April 1996) is a German diver.

With his partner Patrick Hausding, he won a bronze medal at the 2020 Summer Olympics in Tokyo in the Men's synchronized 3 metre springboard competition. He also won a bronze medal in the 3 m synchro springboard competition at the 2018 European Aquatics Championships.

References

External links

1996 births
Living people
German male divers
Divers from Berlin
Divers at the 2020 Summer Olympics
Medalists at the 2020 Summer Olympics
Olympic divers of Germany
Olympic medalists in diving
Olympic bronze medalists for Germany
World Aquatics Championships medalists in diving
21st-century German people